Giuliano Losacco (born March 17, 1977) is a Brazilian racing driver. He is the 2004 and 2005 Stock Car Brasil champion.

Racing career

Complete Stock Car Brasil results

References

External links

1977 births
Living people
Racing drivers from São Paulo
Brazilian racing drivers
Brazilian NASCAR drivers
Stock Car Brasil drivers
U.S. F2000 National Championship drivers